Guillermo García (born November 17, 1955) is a 2-time Olympic distance swimmer from Mexico. He swam for Mexico at the 1972 and 1976 Olympics.

He won the bronze medal in the Men's 1500m Freestyle at the 1971 Pan American Games, and was a finalist in the same event at the 1972 Olympics.

References

1955 births
Living people
Mexican male swimmers
Swimmers at the 1971 Pan American Games
Swimmers at the 1972 Summer Olympics
Swimmers at the 1975 Pan American Games
Swimmers at the 1976 Summer Olympics
Olympic swimmers of Mexico
Pan American Games bronze medalists for Mexico
Pan American Games medalists in swimming
Competitors at the 1970 Central American and Caribbean Games
Competitors at the 1974 Central American and Caribbean Games
Central American and Caribbean Games gold medalists for Mexico
Central American and Caribbean Games medalists in swimming
Mexican male freestyle swimmers
Medalists at the 1971 Pan American Games
Medalists at the 1975 Pan American Games
20th-century Mexican people
21st-century Mexican people